Michael John Taylor  is a former senior Australian public servant and policymaker. He is currently an Independent Director of the Bushfire CRC.

Life and career
Mike Taylor grew up in Melbourne, Victoria. In 1970 he completed his Bachelor of Agricultural Science having studied at the University of Melbourne.

Taylor took his first job with the Victorian Department of Agriculture in 1971. With the support of a cadetship from the Department, he completed a graduate Diploma in Agriculture Economics, attained from the University of New England in 1972.

In the 1980s, Taylor worked at the Australian Dairy Industry Council.

He was Secretary of the Victorian State Government Department of Agriculture, prior to his appointment as Secretary of the Australian Government Department of Agriculture, Fisheries and Forestry.

In 2004, Taylor moved from the Agriculture department to the Department of Transport and Regional Services (later Infrastructure, Transport, Regional Development and Local Government). There he assumed responsibility for implementing several initiatives to upgrade maritime, aviation and land transport security.

Taylor retired from the Australian Public Service in 2009, amid rumours of a falling out with the Rudd Government.

In the years since he was a departmental secretary, Taylor has taken up several board positions, including as an Independent Director for the Bushfire Cooperative Research Centre, and as chairman of the Murray-Darling Basin Authority.

When he retired from the Murray-Darling Basin Authority Board, Taylor urged the Australian Government to "reconsider the next phase" of a controversial plan to restore the health of the Murray Darling river system. During his time as Chair on the Authority, he was personally criticised by people concerned that the proposed cuts to water entitlements under the plan would harm their towns.

Awards
Taylor was awarded a Centenary Medal in 2001 for service as Secretary of the Department of Agriculture, Fisheries and Forestry.

In June 2007 Taylor was made an Officer of the Order of Australia for 'service to the management of natural resources and industry policy development at the Federal level and also in Victoria, particularly in the area of agriculture, and through contributions to transport, water, food and safety standards'.

References

References and further reading

Australian public servants
Living people
Year of birth missing (living people)
University of New England (Australia) alumni
University of Melbourne alumni
Officers of the Order of Australia
Recipients of the Centenary Medal